The Schleswig-Holstein Football Association, the SHFV, is one of 21 state organisations of the German Football Association, the DFB, and covers most parts of the state of Schleswig-Holstein.

Overview

The SHFV is also part of the Northern German Football Association, one of five regional federations in Germany. The other members of the regional association are the Bremen Football Association, the Hamburg Football Association and the Lower Saxony Football Association.

In 2017, the SHFV had 184,551 members, 585 member clubs and 5,046 teams playing in its league system.

References

External links
 DFB website  
 NFV website  
 SHFV website 

Football in Schleswig-Holstein
Football governing bodies in Germany
1947 establishments in Germany